Eudora School District was a school district based in Eudora, Arkansas.

On July 1, 1985, the Ross Van Ness School District consolidated into the Eudora district. On February 13, 2006, the Eudora district consolidated into the Lakeside School District. The Eudora district was consolidated under the Omnibus act.

References

Further reading
Map of Eudora district and Ross Van Ness district
 - The map indicates the boundary of the Eudora School District even though it already consolidated into the Lakeside School District in 2006.
 (Download)

External links
 
 Eudora School District-Lakeside-0903000 Final Report." State of Arkansas.
Education in Chicot County, Arkansas
Defunct school districts in Arkansas
2006 disestablishments in Arkansas
School districts disestablished in 2006